Brown Township is one of eleven townships in Ripley County, Indiana. As of the 2010 census, its population was 1,597 and it contained 728 housing units.

History
John Linsey Rand House was listed on the National Register of Historic Places in 1994.

Geography

Unincorporated towns
 Benham
 Cross Plains
 Friendship
 Olean

References

External links
 Indiana Township Association
 United Township Association of Indiana

Townships in Ripley County, Indiana
Townships in Indiana